Red Moon is the fourth extended play by South Korean co-ed group Kard. It was released on February 12, 2020, by DSP Media and distributed by Kakao M. The EP consists of five tracks, including the previously released single "Dumb Litty" and the title track of the same name.

Release 
The EP was released on February 12, 2020, through several music portals, including MelOn and Apple Music.

Commercial performance 
The EP peaked at number 4 on the Hanteo Daily Chart for its first day sales. It also charted in the top 10 for other two days, registering 1,794 copies sold. 

The EP debuted and peaked at number 10 on the Gaon Album Chart for the week ending February 15, after reporting 1,453 copies sold. In its second week it fell to number 37, after reporting 299 copies sold. The EP has sold 1,752 copies in its first two weeks.

Track listing

Charts

References 

2020 EPs
DSP Media albums
Kard (group) albums